Francis Galtier (11 May 1907 - 15 June 1986) was a French sprinter. He competed in the men's 4 × 400 metres relay at the 1924 Summer Olympics.

References

External links
 

1907 births
1986 deaths
Athletes (track and field) at the 1924 Summer Olympics
French male sprinters
Olympic athletes of France
Place of birth missing